Lakshminarayanan Vignesh (born 20 March 1989) is an Indian cricketer who plays for Tamil Nadu. He made his first-class debut on 1 October 2015 in the 2015–16 Ranji Trophy.

References

External links
 

1989 births
Living people
Indian cricketers
Tamil Nadu cricketers
Cricketers from Chennai